David Watkins may refer to:

David Watkins (Australian politician) (1865–1935), Member of the Australian House of Representatives 1901–1935
David Oliver Watkins (1896–1971), Member of the Australian House of Representatives from 1935 to 1958, son of the above Member
David Watkins (rugby) (born 1942), Welsh dual-code rugby international, career 1967–1983
David Watkins (British politician) (1925–2013), British Labour Politician, MP for Consett until 1983
David Ogden Watkins (1862–1938), Acting Governor of New Jersey, 1898–1899
David Watkins (designer) (graduated 1963), British designer
David Watkins (cricketer) (born 1928), former English cricketer
Dave Watkins (baseball) (born 1944), former Major League Baseball player
Dave Watkins (cyclist), English cyclist
David Watkins (Kentucky politician) (born 1943)
David Watkins, a figure in the White House travel office controversy under U.S. President Bill Clinton
David Watkins (special effects artist) - An Academy Award-winning British special effects artist

See also
David Watkin (disambiguation)